Hellinsia lenis is a moth of the family Pterophoridae. It is found in Colombia and Ecuador.

The wingspan is 17‑19 mm. The forewings are ochreous‑white and the markings are pale brown. The hindwings and fringes are brown‑grey. Adults are on wing in December.

References

Moths described in 1877
lenis
Pterophoridae of South America
Fauna of Ecuador
Moths of South America